Greenfield Girls' Primary School is a  public English medium high school for girls in Cape Town, Western Cape, South Africa. Founded in 1956, the school was originally known as Claremont Girls’ Primary School but the name was changed later in the same year. Greenfield Girls' Primary School is located in the suburb of Kenilworth and is a quintile 5 fee paying school within the  Western Cape Education Department's school system.

References 

Schools in Cape Town
Schools in South Africa
Educational institutions established in 1956
1956 establishments in South Africa